Erving Leslie Kantlehner (July 31, 1892 – February 3, 1990), nicknamed "Peanuts", was a professional baseball player who played pitcher in the Major Leagues from 1914 to 1916. Kantlehner played for the Pittsburgh Pirates and Philadelphia Phillies. Kantlehner attended Santa Clara University.

External links

1892 births
1990 deaths
Major League Baseball pitchers
Baseball players from California
Philadelphia Phillies players
Pittsburgh Pirates players
Victoria Bees players
Indianapolis Indians players
San Francisco Seals (baseball) players